was a Japanese film director best known for Sakamoto Ryoma (1928) and The Great Buddha Arrival (1934). He was an early pioneer of Japanese cinema who trained many outstanding directors and cinematographers including Eiji Tsuburaya.

Life 
Edamasa was born in Kushima, Saeki, Hiroshima Prefecture (present-day Hatsukaichi, Hiroshima).

In 1910, he began working in the film industry when he was hired by Yoshizawa Shōten. He later worked as an operator also for Fukuhōdō , Tōyō Shōkai and Tenkatsu Nippori.

He made his debut as a director in 1919 on the film Ai no kyoku which was considered to be one of the most advanced films of that time. By the end of the 1930s, Edamasa had directed more than 20 films.

Edamasa belonged to a group of directors who emphasized the realistic style of acting.

Selected filmography 

 Yoshitsune sembon zakura (1914) - Cinematographer
 Ninjutsu kaiso Koga Saburou (1918) - Cinematographer
 Momochi sandayu (1918) - Cinematographer
 Ai no kyoku (1919) - Director and Cinematographer
 Awaremi no kyoku (1919) -  Director
 Shima no tsuka (1920) - Director
 Korokuden (1924) - Director
 Fuyuki shinju (1924) - Director
 Sakamoto Ryoma (1928) - Director
 Tsukigata hanpeita (1929) - Director
 Higo no komageta (1929) - Director
 kōboro kakū no kyōjin (1932) - Director
 The Great Buddha Arrival (1934) - Director (Last work)

References

External links 

 
 Yoshiro Edamasa at Japanese Movie Database

1888 births
Japanese film directors
1944 deaths